John Hurst Ditchburn (13 March 1897 – January 1992) was an English professional footballer who played as a wing half in the Football League for Sunderland and Exeter City. He was born in Leeds and settled in Exeter, but had spent most of his childhood in Cambuslang, Scotland and began his career with local clubs.

References

1897 births
1992 deaths
Footballers from Leeds
Sportspeople from Cambuslang
English footballers
Association football wing halves
Cambuslang Rangers F.C. players
Blantyre Victoria F.C. players
Sunderland A.F.C. players
Exeter City F.C. players
English Football League players
Scottish Junior Football Association players
Footballers from South Lanarkshire